Catopsis wangerinii is a species in the genus Catopsis. This species is native to Central America, Colombia, and Mexico.

References

wangerinii
Flora of Central America
Flora of Mexico
Flora of Colombia